Fünf auf dem Apfelstern is a German television series.

See also
List of German television series

External links
 

German television shows featuring puppetry
German children's television series
1981 German television series debuts
1981 German television series endings
German-language television shows
Das Erste original programming